Mittenwald is a German municipality in the district of Garmisch-Partenkirchen, in Bavaria.

Geography
Mittenwald is located approximately 16 kilometres to the south-east of Garmisch-Partenkirchen. It is situated in the Valley of the River Isar, by the northern foothills of the Alps, on the route between the old banking and commercial centre of Augsburg, to the north, and Innsbruck to the south-east, beyond which is the Brenner Pass and the route to Lombardy, another region with a rich commercial past and present.

History

Mittenwald, along with Garmisch-Partenkirchen to the west, was acquired by the Prince-Bishopric of Freising in the late 14th century and the "crowned Aethiopian" head that is part of Mittenwald's coat of arms recalls that 400-year association that ended when the Prince-Bishopric was secularized in 1802-03 and its territory annexed to Bavaria.

Mittenwald's location as an important transit centre on a relatively low (and therefore predictable) transalpine route has been a defining feature of the area for at least two thousand years: during the sixteenth and seventeenth centuries traffic was boosted by large treasure trains sent regularly from Spain to pay troops in the Netherlands, the more conventional sea route having been rendered unreliable by the (usually) discreet but effective sympathy with which the English Protestant establishment favoured the Spanish king's rebellious Dutch subjects.

Twin City
 Wyk auf Föhr, Germany

Economy
Mittenwald is famous for the manufacture of violins, violas and cellos which began in the mid-17th century by the Klotz family of violin makers, and has been a popular stop with tourists and student luthiers since the 1930s. You can also visit the museum for violin lutherie.

Notable places
The most significant landmark in the village is the pink colored Roman Catholic church of Saints Peter and Paul, which is typical of the region. The church and many of the surrounding buildings, both businesses and private residences, are decorated with elaborate paintings on the exterior walls. Near the Luttenseekaserne there is a monument honoring the participants of the Slutsk Defence Action.

Notable people 
 Matthias Klotz (1640 in Mittenwald - 1696) violin maker 
 Max Seiling (1852 in Mittenwald – 1928) a German engineer and writer
 Georg Schreyögg (1870–1934) a German sculptor, brought up in Mittenwald
 Max Rieger (born 1946 in Mittenwald) a German former alpine skier who competed in the 1968 and 1972 Winter Olympics
 Dieter Berkmann (born 1950 in Mittenwald) a German former cyclist, competed at the 1972 and 1976 Summer Olympics
 Traudl Maurer (born 1961 in Mittenwald) a German ski mountaineer and long-distance runner.
 Anton Jais (1748 - ca.1836) violin maker

References

External links

 
 Virtual tour of Mittenwald 
 Museum of violin manufacturing 

Garmisch-Partenkirchen (district)